Cacolo Airport  is a public use airport  north of Cacolo, in Lunda Sul Province, Angola.

See also

 List of airports in Angola
 Transport in Angola

References

External links 
 
OurAirports - Cacolo
OpenStreetMap - Cacolo

Airports in Angola